Couleurs sur Paris is the fourth album by the French covers band Nouvelle Vague, released 16 November 2010. The album is the group's first to be sung mostly in French, consisting largely of covers of French new wave and post-punk songs from the 1970s and 1980s. The album attracted mixed reviews in the French-speaking press.

Release
The album peaked at number 52 in the French album charts, spending a total of 9 weeks in the top 200. It reached number 35 in Greece, number 73 in Switzerland, and number 47 in Belgium (Walloon chart).

Track listing

References 

2009 albums
Nouvelle Vague (band) albums
Covers albums